Nathanael Pringsheim (30 November 1823 – 6 October 1894)  was a German botanist.

Biography
Nathanael Pringsheim was born at Landsberg, Prussian Silesia, and studied at the universities of Breslau, Leipzig, and Berlin successively. He graduated in 1848 as doctor of philosophy with the thesis De forma et incremento stratorum crassiorum in plantarum cellula, and rapidly became a leader in the great botanical renaissance of the 19th century.

His contributions to scientific phycology were of striking interest. Pringsheim was among the first to demonstrate the occurrence of a sexual process in this class of plants, and he drew from his observations weighty conclusions as to the nature of sexuality.

Together with the French investigators Gustave Adolphe Thuret (1817–1875) and Jean-Baptiste Édouard Bornet (1828–1911), Pringsheim ranks as the founder of our scientific knowledge of the algae. Among his researches in this field may be mentioned those on Vaucheria (1855), the Oedogoniaceae (1855–1858), the Coleochaeteae (1860), Hydrodictyon (1861), and Pandorina (1869); the last-mentioned memoir bore the title Beobachtungen über die Paarung de Zoosporen. This was a discovery of fundamental importance; the conjugation of zoospores was regarded by Pringsheim, with good reason, as the primitive form of sexual reproduction.

A work on the course of morphological differentiation in the Sphacelariaceae (1873), a family of marine algae, is of great interest, inasmuch as it treats of evolutionary questions; the authors point of view is that of Carl Nägeli (1817–1891) rather than Darwin. Closely connected with Pringsheim's algological work was his long-continued investigation of the Saprolegniaceae, a family of algoid fungi, some of which have become notorious as the causes of disease in fish.

Among his contributions to our knowledge of the higher plants, his exhaustive monograph on the curious genus of water-ferns, Salvinia, deserves special mention. His career as a morphologist culminated in 1876 with the publication of a memoir on the alternation of generations in thallophytes and mosses. From 1874 to the close of his life Pringsheim's activity was chiefly directed to physiological questions: he published, in a long series of memoirs, a theory of the carbon-assimilation of green plants, the central point of which is the conception of the chlorophyll-pigment as a screen, with the main function of protecting the protoplasm from light-rays which would neutralize its assimilative activity by stimulating too active respiration. This view has not been accepted as offering an adequate explanation of the phenomena. Pringsheim founded in 1858, and edited until his death, the classical Jahrbücher für wissenschaftliche Botanik, which still bears his name. He was also founder, in 1882, and first president, of the German Botanical Society.

His work was for the most part carried on in his private laboratory in Berlin; he only held a teaching post of importance for four years, 1864–1868, when he was professor at Jena. In early life he was a keen politician on the Liberal side. He died in Berlin.

A fuller account of Pringsheim's career will be found in Nature, (1895) vol. Ii., and in the Berichte der deutschen botanischen Gesellschaft, (1895) vol. xiii. The latter is by his friend and colleague, Ferdinand Cohn.

In 1866 botanist Stephan Schulzer von Müggenburg published Pringsheimia  (a genus of fungi, in Saccotheciaceae family) and named in Pringsheim's honour. Then in 1920 Franz Xaver Rudolf von Höhnel published in Ann. Mykol. vol.18 Pringsheimiella, which is a genus of green algae, in the family Ulvellaceae. In 1939, John Nathaniel Couch published Pringsheimiella (a genus of fungi).

The standard botanical author abbreviation Pringsh. is applied to species he described.

See also 
 Pringsheim

Notes

References
Attribution
 A fuller account of Pringsheim's career will be found in:
 Nature, (1895) vol. Ii.
 Ferdinand Cohn  (1895) Berichte der deutschen botanischen Gesellschaft, vol. xiii.

External links 
 Jewish Encyclopedia

1823 births
1894 deaths
People from Olesno County
Phycologists
Botanists with author abbreviations
19th-century German botanists
German mycologists
Members of the Prussian Academy of Sciences
People from the Province of Silesia
University of Breslau alumni
Leipzig University alumni
Humboldt University of Berlin alumni
Academic staff of the Humboldt University of Berlin
Academic staff of the University of Jena